Le Racing won The 1988-89 French Rugby Union Championship [after beating Agen in the final.

Le Racing won his first bouclier de Brennus from 1959

Formula 

 The tournament was played by 80 clubs divided in sixteen pools of five. .
 The two better of each pool (a sum of 32 clubs) were admitted to the group A to play for the title
 In the second round th e32 clubs of group A were divided in four pools of eight.
 The four better of each pool of group A (16 clubs) were qualified to play the knockout stage

Group A qualification round to knockout stage 
The teams are listed as the ranking, in bold the teams admitted  to "last 16" round.

"Last 16"  
In bold the clubs qualified for the quarter of finals.

Quarter of finals 
In bold the clubs qualified for the next round

Semifinals

Final

External links
 Compte rendu finale 1990 lnr.fr

1990
France
Championship